Kohi Apna Sa is a Hindi drama television series. Shruti, Khushi and Sanjana are best friends and coincidentally all three get married in same family. The three friends live a happy life in each other's company, until tragedy strikes and Shruti's husband is murdered. The show started with good ratings on Zee TV and also became one of the most watched of channel but suddenly show started losing viewership and went off air in January, 2003. It used to air from Monday to Friday from 15 October 2001 to 20 September 2002 and then it used to air from Monday to Thursday from 23 September 2002 to 15 January 2003.

Plot

Khushi, Shruti and Sanjana are the closest of friends who dote on each other. As luck would have it, they marry three cousins—Vishal, Tushar and Kabir, respectively—and living in the same house. As they cope with the challenges of adjusting into a huge joint family, their friendship comes under pressure; but they always try to support each other.

Their lives take an unexpectedly tragic turn when Tushar is murdered and his wife Shruti arrested for the crime. Though Shruti protests that she is innocent, she is taken away by the police. Khushi and Sanjana watch helplessly, while the other family members condemn Shruti. Later, they are told that a police van carrying Shruti has met with an accident, killing her along with the other occupants.

Several years later, a successful businesswoman named Mallika Singhania comes in contact with Khushi, Sanjana and their husbands. Friendly at first, Mallika later unveils a ruthless plan for ruining Vishal and Kabir. When Khushi and Sanjana confront Mallika, they make a shocking discovery. Mallika is none other than Shruti, who has survived the accident, but undergone plastic surgery to fix her ruined face. With the support of a wealthy and generous old lady, Shruti has built up a new identity as Mallika. She believes that Vishal and Kabir have killed Tushar and implicated her; so, she is seeking revenge from them. She is also angry with Khushi and Sanjana for having abandoned her.

Mallika a.k.a. Shruti effects Vishal and Kabir arrest. But new evidence appears, revealing someone else was the murderer. The identity of the murderer who turns out to be Roshni, along with the motive for murder, is disclosed only at the end and leaves everybody flabbergasted. It is revealed that she killed Tushar to in order to marry his brother Rahul.

Cast

 Manasi Salvi as Khushi Vishal Gill  
 Narayani Shastri as Shruti Tushar Gill (before plastic surgery)
 Smita Bansal as Shruti Tushar Gill (after plastic surgery) Mallika Singhania
 Sherrin Varghese / Akhil Ghai as Tushar Rajan Gill 
 Hrishikesh Pandey as Vishal Raman Gill
 Aparna Tilak as Sanjana Kabir Gill
 Puneet Vashisht as Kabir Vikram Gill
 Vikas Bhalla as Aditya
 Aashish Kaul as Sameer
 Madan Joshi as Mr. Gill (grandfather Of Vishal, Tushar and Kabir)
 Anju Mahendru as Neelam Raman Gill (Vishal's mother)
 Neelam Mehra as Sheetal Vikram Gill (Kabir's mother)
 Daman Mann as Raman Gill (Vishal's father)
 Uday Tikekar as Vikram Gill Kabir's father 
 Madhavi Gogate as Raksha Rajan Gill (Tushar's mother)
 Mukesh Rawal as Rajan Gill (Tushar's father)
 Kishori Shahane as Bimla (Khushi's mother)
 Kanika Shivpuri as Shruti's aunt
 Sushil Parashar as Sanjana's father
 Manorama as Sarla Bua 
 Prabhat Bhattacharya as Rahul Rajan Gill
 Vaishali Saini as Roshni Mehra / Roshni Rahul Gill
 Meenakshi Gupta as Priya Rahul Gill
 Smita Singh as Urvashi Rajan Gill
 Gaurav Gera as Akash
 Gunn Kansara / Kavita Kaushik as Rachana Raman Gill
 Mehul Kajaria as Nachiket Rajan Gill
 Shabnam Sayed as Deepika Rajan Gill (Tushar's eldest sister)
 Sagarika Soni as Neharika Raman Gill (Vishal's eldest sister)
 Amrita Prakash as Kavita / Komal Tushar Gill
 Kali Prasad Mukherjee as CBI Inspector Rane
 Surendra Pal as Umesh Mehra (Roshni's father)
 Roopa Divetia as Sharda Umesh Mehra (Roshni's mother)
 Gargi Patel as Gayatri Singhania
 Manish Khanna
 Vijay Bhatia as Aashish
 Chandni Bhagwanani as child Komal

Reception

The show had redefine Indian Television in 2002 as the show was completely different from its sister shows produced under same production house Balaji Telefilms. The show don't had loud music and heavy VFX. The show had high emotional content and the characters were relevant to housewives. The character of Khushi Gill played by Manasi Salvi had many related qualities with Indian house wives as she was full of emotions and took decisions by heart not by brain. The show had a reality element while showing the friendship bond. The character of Sanjana played by Aparna Tilak was showcased as an over-confident and smart girl mixture that seems very real. The characters were neither shown in heavy saris and bindis nor was there any over-the-top drama. The bonding showed among the three friends was appreciable as it was the main focus of the show. The show had good TRPs and viewership unless the complete focus of story didn't shifted to Shruti and Tushar. The show was introduced as a story of three friends and their strong bonding even under hard circumstances but suddenly the complete focus was shifted to Shruti's life and show started losing viewership. A twist introduced of Tushar's murder and show again continued its smooth ride until the story reached more than 150 episodes, after which ratings declined and the show was cancelled.

Awards

Won
 Manasi Salvi won Best Actress at 10th Kalakar Awards in the year 2002.
 Rekhha Modi won Best Dialogue Writer at 1st Indian Telly Awards in the year 2002.
 The Show won Best New Serial at 1st Indian Telly Awards in the year 2002.
 The Show won Best Serial at 11th Kalakar Awards in the year 2003.

Nominated
 Manasi Salvi nominated for Best Actress at 1st Indian Telly Awards 2002.
 The Show nominated for Best Drama Series at 1st Indian Telly Awards 2002.
 The Show nominated for Best Daily Serial at 1st Indian Telly Awards 2002.
 Preeti & Pinky nominated for Best Playback Singer at 1st Indian Telly Awards 2002.
 Aparna Tilak nominated for Best Actress in Comic Role at 1st Indian Telly Awards 2002.
 Aparna Tilak and Puneet Vasishtha nominated for Best Jodi at 1st Indian Telly Awards 2002.
 The Show nominated for Best Drama Serial at 2nd ITA Awards 2002

References

External links 
 
 Kohi Apna Sa on Zee5
Kohi Apna Sa News Article on Tribune India
News Article on Indiantelevision.com

Balaji Telefilms television series
Indian television soap operas
Zee TV original programming
2001 Indian television series debuts
2003 Indian television series endings